Königsbann, literally king's ban (more rarely bannum, from the OHG: ban), was the exercise of royal jurisdiction in the Holy Roman Empire.

A specific ban (German: Bann) identified:
 the actual order or prohibition
 the penalties for contravening the ban
 the region to which the ban applied

The king's ban in the legal history of the Holy Roman Empire was divided into several distinct types depending on their function:
 Heerbann, the right to raise an army,
 Blutbann (blood courts; high jurisdiction which included capital punishment),
 Friedensbann (special royal protection of people and property),
 Verordnungsbann (the authority to decide legal standards) and
 Verwaltungsbann (the force to be used).

The king used a so-called Bannleihe ("ban investiture") to transfer (invest) the ban, especially the Blutbann, to counts or advocates to exercise.

See also 
 Imperial ban, decree of outlawry in the Holy Roman empire
 Zwing und Bann, lower level jurisdiction in Switzerland
 Anathema, called Kirchenbann in German

Literature 
 Mittellateinisches Wörterbuch, I 1967, Sp. 1341 - 1348 s.v. bannus
 Heinrich Mitteis; Heinz Lieberich, Deutsche Rechtsgeschichte. Ein Studienbuch. Munich, 1974 u.ö.

External links 
 bann in the German Legal Dictionary

Konigsbann
German feudalism